Yasenki is a rural locality (a settlement) and the administrative center of Yasenkovskoye Rural Settlement, Bobrovsky District, Voronezh Oblast, Russia. The population was 611 as of 2010. There are 17 streets.

Geography 
Yasenki is located 8 km southwest of Bobrov (the district's administrative centre) by road. Bityug is the nearest rural locality.

References 

Rural localities in Bobrovsky District